Jacobus is a masculine first name, which is a variant of Jacob, Jack and James. The name may refer to:

First name
Jacobus Arminius (1560–1609), Dutch theologian
Jacobus de Baen (1673–1700), Dutch portrait painter 
Jacobus Barbireau (1455–1491), Flemish composer
Jacobus Barnaart (1726–1780), Dutch merchant
Jacobus Bartschius (c.1600–1633), German astronomer
Jacobus Bellamy (1757–1786), Dutch poet
Jacobus Franciscus Benders (1924–2017), Dutch mathematician
Jacobus Bisschop (1658–1697), Dutch painter
Jacobus Cornelis Bloem (1825–1902), Dutch Minister of Finance
Jacobus Bontius (1592–1631), Dutch physician
Jacobus Boomsma (born 1951), Dutch evolutionary biologist
Jacobus Boonen (1573–1655), Flemish Archbishop
Jacobus Nicolaas Boshoff (1808–1881), South African politician
Jacobus Buys (1724–1801), Dutch painter 
Jacobus Capitein (c.1717–1747), Dutch Christian minister of Ghanaian birth
Jacobus a Castro (1560–1639), Dutch bishop
Jacobus de Cessolis (c.1250–c.1322), Italian chess author
Jacobus Petrus Duminy (1897–1980), South African academic
Jacobus Josephus Eeckhout (1793–1861), Flemish painter
Jacobus van Egmond (1908–1969), Dutch cyclist
Jacobus Johannes Fouché (1898–1980), South African politician and president
Jacobus Cornelis Gaal (1796–1866), Dutch painter
Jacobus Golius (1596–1667), Dutch mathematician
Jacobus Arnoldus Graaff (1863–1927), South African politician
Jacobus Henricus van 't Hoff (1852–1911), Dutch physical chemist and Nobel Laureate
Jacobus Kaper (born 1931), biochemist and virologist
Jacobus Kapteyn (1851–1922), Dutch astronomer
Jacobus de Kerle (1531–1591), Flemish composer and organist
Jacobus Kloppers (born 1937), Canadian composer
Jacobus Hendricus van Lint (1932–2004), Dutch mathematician and university president
Jacobus van Looy (1855–1930), Dutch painter and writer
Jacobus Mancadan (1602–1680), Dutch painter
Jacobus Anthonie Meessen (1836–1885), Dutch photographer
Jacobus van Meteren (1519–c.1555), Dutch printer; printed first English-language Bible in Antwerp
Jacobus Oud (1890–1963), Dutch architect
Jacobus Hendrik Pierneef (1886–1957), South African landscape artist
Jacobus Ferdinandus Saey (1658–1726), Flemish painter
Jacobus Wilhelmus Sauer (1850–1913), South African politician
Jacobus Spoors (1751–1833), Dutch politician 
Jacobus Gideon Nel Strauss (1900–1990), South African politician
Jacobus Swartwout (1734–1827), American general and politician
Jacobus de la Torre (1608–1661), Dutch Archbishop
Jacobus Van Cortlandt (1658–1739), American mayor
Jacobus van der Merwe (born 1937), South African politician
Jacobus van der Vecht (1906–1992), Dutch entomologist
Jacobus de Voragine (c.1230–1298), Italian chronicler and archbishop of Genoa
Jacobus Johannes Venter (1814–1889), South African politician 
Jacobus Verhoeff (1927–2018), Dutch mathematician
Jacobus Verster (1919–1981), South African general
Jacobus van de Water (1643–1712), Dutch mayor of New Amsterdam
Jacobus, pseudonym of Jacques Alphonse Doucet of Radio Radio

Surname
Donald Lines Jacobus (1887–1970), American genealogist
Melancthon Williams Jacobus Sr.
Melancthon Williams Jacobus Jr.
Marc Jacobus (born 1951), American bridge player 
Preston Jacobus (1864–1911), American businessman and politician
Russell Jacobus (born 1944), American bishop
Tim Jacobus (born 1959), American artist

See also
Jacob (name)

Dutch masculine given names
Surnames